The Galerias da Feteira (literally the Galleries of Feteira) is a geological feature in the civil parish of Feteira in the municipality of Angra do Heroísmo, on the Portuguese island of Terceira Island in the archipelago of the Azores.

The Galerias are lava tubes, located between Pico Geraldes, Pico do Magina and Pico da Vima, that consist of a series of  tunnel/caves carved from molten lava that cooled.

Caves of the Azores
Angra do Heroísmo
Lava tubes